Narayani Gupta (born 13 November 1942) is an Indian historian, author, and professor (retired) at Jamia Millia Islamia University, New Delhi. She taught at Indraprastha College from 1966 before joining Jamia Millia Islamia University in 1988. From 1991 to 1995, she taught at the TVB School of Habitat Studies.

She is the author of works on urban history, particularly the history of Delhi. Her book, Delhi between Two Empires, based on her doctoral thesis was recognised by reviewers as 'groundbreaking'. She is a founder-member and former president (1986–88) of the Conservation Society of Delhi which emerged out of the Environment Group. She was a member of Delhi's Urban Art Commission from 1992 to 1995, and again from 2004 to 2007. From 2004 to 2012, she was associated with the Indian National Trust for Cultural Heritage, as consultant on their Heritage Education programmes and their documentation centre.

Academic Contributions

Gupta has written history books for the National Book Trust and Orient Longman, and in 2019 edited a series of books on UNESCO world heritage sites. She headed the committee on middle school social science textbooks for the Delhi SCERT in 2002-04, was a member of NCERT's National Focus Group on Teaching of Social Sciences, and editor of the History textbook for Class 11 (2005).

Activism and writing

She is a columnist for newspapers and online magazines like Indian Express, Hindu, Times of India etc and writes about historical matters and contemporary history.

She remains actively engaged with the conservation of Delhi's monuments and urban landscape. She is one of the people who took a stand on the issue of the redevelopment of Central Vista and filed a case in Supreme Court against it.

Biography
She is wife of noted historian Prof Partha Sarathi Gupta and the third daughter of Narayani Menon and VKR Menon, an Indian Civil Services officer in Bihar state of British India. Growing up in Delhi after 1946, she could observe the rapid changes in the social fabric post-Partition and the planning of Independent India. These were to feed into her recreation of urban pasts.

References

1942 births
20th-century Indian historians
Writers from Delhi
Historians of India
Alumni of the University of Oxford
20th-century Indian non-fiction writers
21st-century Indian historians
Living people